The 2019–20 Australian Baseball League season was the tenth year Australian Baseball League (ABL) season. The Melbourne Aces won their first title after defeating the Adelaide Giants in the postseason.

Teams 

On 27 August 2019, the Adelaide franchise announced it changed its name from the Adelaide Bite to the Adelaide Giants. This was the name of the Adelaide franchise from 1989–1999 and is the first renaming of a team in the league's history.

The Tuatara also moved their team from the baseball-specific venue of McLeod Park to North Harbour Stadium, which was converted to a baseball field for the first time.

Regular season 
The league retains a 10-round, 40 game schedule, with teams playing division rivals eight times and inter division teams four times. 
Auckland, Brisbane, Canberra and Sydney grouped into the 'Northeast Division' with Adelaide, Geelong, Melbourne and Perth grouped into the 'Southwest Division'.

Scheduled doubleheaders consist of a seven inning game followed by a nine inning game. The league uses the WBSC tiebreaker rule for all games going beyond the 9th inning, or extra innings beginning less than one hour to a curfew.
In November, 2019 it was announced all games played at North Harbour Stadium would be reduced to seven innings to suit a local broadcast deal with Sky Sport.

In round six, one of the games between the Bandits and Cavalry in Canberra was suspended due to poor air quality conditions following the severity of the 2019–20 Australian bushfire season, with the game completed the next day. The following round seven matchup between the Giants and Cavalry in Canberra was cancelled due to the same poor air quality, reducing their schedule to 36 games. 
The conditions were the main contributing factor to Cavalry player Gavin Cecchini returning home before the completion of the season.

Each team's series roster consists of 22 eligible players in addition to four amateur underage development players.

holds tiebreaker

Statistical leaders

Awards

Postseason
The postseason continued to include the top five teams, with a single wild card game between the fourth and fifth seeds prior to two rounds of best-of-three finals series.

The top seed was awarded to the team with the best regular season record, with the other division winner awarded the second seed. The third and fourth seed were awarded to the two divisional runner ups with the fifth seed being given to the team with the next best season record.

The only change to the playoff structure from the previous season was the higher semi final was given home field advantage in games two and three (if required), with game one hosted by the lower seed.

Shane Robinson was named Championship Series MVP after batting 5/10 with three RBI and one home-run. He batted .412/.500/.647 across the postseason.

Championship Series

References

External links 
The Australian Baseball League – Official ABL Website
Official Baseball Australia Website

Australian Baseball League seasons
Australian Baseball League
Australian Baseball League